Armands Bērziņš (born 27 December 1983) is a Latvian professional ice hockey centre currently playing for HK Prizma Riga of the Optibet Hockey League. He played for Dinamo Riga of the Kontinental Hockey League and HPK of the Finnish SM-liiga. He was drafted by the Minnesota Wild in the 2002 NHL Entry Draft, 155th overall. Internationally Bērziņš has played for the Latvian national team at multiple tournaments, including the 2006, 2010, and 2014 Winter Olympics.

International
He was named to the Latvia men's national ice hockey team for competition at the 2014 IIHF World Championship.

Career statistics

Regular season and playoffs

LAT totals do not include stats from the 2006–07 playoffs.

International

References

External links
 
 
 
 

1983 births
Living people
Beibarys Atyrau players
Dinamo Riga players
Füchse Duisburg players
Gothiques d'Amiens players
HC Pustertal Wölfe players
HK Nitra players
HK Riga 2000 players
HPK players
Ice hockey players at the 2006 Winter Olympics
Ice hockey players at the 2010 Winter Olympics
Ice hockey players at the 2014 Winter Olympics
Kompanion Kiev players
Latvian ice hockey centres
LHK Jestřábi Prostějov players
Louisiana IceGators (ECHL) players
Minnesota Wild draft picks
Olympic ice hockey players of Latvia
Prizma Riga players
Shawinigan Cataractes players
Ice hockey people from Riga
VHK Vsetín players
Wheeling Nailers players
Yunost Minsk players
Latvian expatriate sportspeople in Canada
Latvian expatriate sportspeople in the United States
Latvian expatriate sportspeople in the Czech Republic
Latvian expatriate sportspeople in Finland
Latvian expatriate sportspeople in Belarus
Latvian expatriate sportspeople in Ukraine
Latvian expatriate sportspeople in Kazakhstan
Latvian expatriate sportspeople in Slovakia
Latvian expatriate sportspeople in Germany
Latvian expatriate sportspeople in France
Expatriate ice hockey players in Canada
Expatriate ice hockey players in the United States
Expatriate ice hockey players in the Czech Republic
Expatriate ice hockey players in Finland
Expatriate ice hockey players in Belarus
Expatriate ice hockey players in Ukraine
Expatriate ice hockey players in Kazakhstan
Expatriate ice hockey players in Slovakia
Expatriate ice hockey players in Germany
Expatriate ice hockey players in France
Latvian expatriate ice hockey people